John Massie Mutz (born November 5, 1935) is an American business leader and politician who served as Lieutenant Governor of Indiana, Republican candidate for Governor and president of Lilly Endowment, one of America's largest family foundations.

Born in Indianapolis, Mutz is a graduate of Northwestern University, earning both a bachelor's degree and master's degrees in advertising and business management there.

Mutz has had a long business career including the management of a large group of Burger Chef restaurants and serving as president of PSI Energy, Indiana's largest utility.

In Indiana politics, he served as State Representative from 1967 to 1970, State Senator from 1971 to 1980 and as the 45th Lieutenant Governor, serving under Robert D. Orr from 1980 to 1988. He ran for Indiana State Treasurer in 1970, but lost the general election. Mutz was defeated by Evan Bayh in the 1988 race for Indiana Governor.

References

1935 births
Lieutenant Governors of Indiana
Northwestern University alumni
Living people
Republican Party members of the Indiana House of Representatives
Republican Party Indiana state senators
Kellogg School of Management alumni
Evan Bayh